Syedi Abdul Qadir Hakimuddin (1665-1730 AD) was a Dawoodi Bohra saint. He is buried in Burhanpur, India. His tomb complex 'Dargah-e-Hakimi'  includes mosques, gardens, and visitor accommodations.

Early life
He was born in the period of 34th Dai Syedna Badruddin Bin Mulla Raj on the 14th of Jamadil Awwal 1077 H (1665 AD).

His father Syedi Bava Mulla Khan visited the 35th Dai Syedna Abdul Taiyeb Zakiuddin in Ahmedabad and presented Saiyedi Abdul Qadir Hakimuddin in Khumus (one fifth of earnings to be presented in the name of god as Mulla Khan was having five sons) on the Dai's request. Syedna Safiuddin, son of Syedna Abdul Tayyib Zakiuddin, took responsibility for his education.

Title
He was presented the status of Haddiyat (sheikh) by 36th Dai Syedna Kalimuddin . He was made Mukasir Al Dawat by Syedna Noor Mohammed Nooruddin and elevated to Mazoon (2nd in command) Al Dawat by 38th Dai Syedna Ismail Badruddin. The 39th Dai Syedna Ibrahim Vajihuddin was the son of Syedi Abdulquadir Hakimuddin.

Books
He some of the Books of Dawat including Bulohar and Buzazaf. He wrote in Urdu, Sanskrit, Persian and Arabic. He translated Sanskrit into Arabic in a book called Qalila Wadhima.

Miracles
The 17th-century saint was known for his piety, humility and erudition. He came to Burhanpur as his way of preaching Islam.  He could recite the entire Quran from memory in childhood. Legend has it that one day while travelling through a forest, he was reciting the Quran when a tiger walked by. The animal sat before the scholar, and quietly walked away once the recitation was over. When Syedi Hakimudin died in 1730 AD (1142 AH, 5th Shawwal), his enemies exhumed his body after 22 days, but were shocked to find a fresh and fragrant body. Over the years, people's faith grew in his miraculous powers. The word hakim denotes a healer and thousands of Bohras flock to his shrine, taking a mannat (vow) for shifa (cure) from disease and seeking health for both the body and the soul. It is said that whoever comes there with a prayer on her/his lips, does not go away disappointed. Those who have their prayers answered, their sick loved ones cured, their sinking businesses nursed back to health, and their other problems solved, come back with a generous offering.

Thousands of pilgrims are served non-vegetarian food, complete with dessert, tender mutton and basmati rice, and fruit.

Lineage
Dawoodi Bohra 53rd Dai Syedna Ali Qadr Mufaddal Saifuddin and 52nd Dai Syedna Mohammad Burhanuddin and all other Dai starting from 39th Dai are from his family.

Photo gallery
Dargah-e-Hakimi

References

External links
 Burhanpur History
 Syedi AbdulQader Hakimuddin

Dawoodi Bohras
People from Burhanpur
1665 births
1730 deaths